This table shows the list of all historical monuments classified or listed in South Corsica.

See also

 List of historical monuments of Ajaccio
 List of historical monuments of Bastia
 Monument historique

References

 
Corse-du-Sud-related lists